The Weineck Cobra Limited Edition is a supercar built by Weineck Engineering, a German car manufacturer. Weineck Cobra's chassis is a traditional Shelby Cobra chassis, a popular performance car built by Carroll Shelby in 1960s.

Features

Engine 
12,900 cc V8 engine 
 Horsepower:  at 7000 rpm
 Torque:  from 3600 rpm to 7000 rpm 
 0–100 km/h: 2.5 sec
 0–200 km/h: 4.9 sec
 0–300 km/h: 10 sec

Style 

According to Exoticcarsite, "the awakening alone is something you’ll never forget in your lifetime. From now on, any form of human conversation is impossible! For anxious, non-addicted human beings it will already mark the end of their journey where ours now begins."

Price 
It was announced that Weineck Cobra Limited Edition's price would be €545,000 in Germany. Because of the power of this exotic performance car, only 15 were produced.

References 
http://www.weineck-power.de/main.html

External links 
 Weineck Power
 Old School Horsepower Hero

Cars of Germany